The 1940 Major League Baseball All-Star Game was the eighth playing of the mid-summer classic between the all-stars of the American League (AL) and National League (NL), the two leagues comprising Major League Baseball. The game was held on July 9, 1940, at Sportsman's Park in St. Louis, Missouri, the home of the St. Louis Cardinals and St. Louis Browns. The game resulted in the National League defeating the American League 4–0.

Rosters
Players in italics have since been inducted into the National Baseball Hall of Fame.

American League

National League

Game

Umpires

The umpires changed assignments in the middle of the fifth inning – Reardon and Basil swapped positions, also Pipgras and Stewart swapped positions.

Starting lineups

Game summary

References

External links
Baseball Almanac
Baseball-Reference

Major League Baseball All-Star Game
Major League Baseball All-Star Game
Major League Baseball All Star Game
Major League Baseball All-Star Game
Baseball competitions in St. Louis
1940s in St. Louis